Muyu (literally, "Wooden fish"; sometimes also , Muyuping) is a town in Shennongjia Forestry District, in the west of Hubei province, People's Republic of China. Located on China National Highway 209, it is the main population and services center of the southern part of the district.

The town is stretched along the upper course of Xiang Stream (Xiang Xi) (or perhaps one of its tributaries), which flows from Shennongjia mountains southeast toward the Yangtze. The river valley is paralleled by China National Highway 209.

Regular minibus service connects it to Yichang and Maoping (Zigui County). There is also less-regular shuttle van service north, to Songbai town (the seat of government of Shennongjia District) and Shiyan; but the road north (beyond Yazikou Junction) is still "unimproved" (as of 2009), and, moreover, that part of Shennongjia is closed to foreigners.

Administrative Divisions
Residential communities:
 Muyuping, Honghuaping, Xiangxiyuan

Villages:
 Honghuaping, Sanduihe, Laojunshan, Chaoshuihe, Qingfeng, Shennongtan, Muyu, Qingtian

Gallery

References

Shennongjia
Township-level divisions of Hubei